"Prblms" (a disemvoweling of "problems" and stylized in all caps) is a single by American singer 6lack. It was released on September 23, 2016, by LoveRenaissance and Interscope Records. The track was produced by NOVA. The song was certified 3× Platinum by the Recording Industry Association of America (RIAA) in December 2020.

Background and release
6lack originally released "Prblms" onto SoundCloud on April 14, 2016. His manager connected with Apple Music's R&B curator, and eventually the song appeared on 10 playlists through the service. In June, media personality Kylie Jenner lip-synced to the song during one of her Snapchat videos, which boosted the popularity of it. 6lack said Jenner's shout-out was a great experience, and it showed him that he was "doing something right." The song was later re-released officially in September of that year.

Lyrically, the song is about a failing relationship. 6lack wrote the song after having a fight with the woman he was seeing at the time; one of the lines from the song is a text that he received from her the night he was writing the song.

Music video
The music video for "Prblms" was released on October 14, 2016, on 6lack's Vevo account.

Charts

Weekly charts

Year-end charts

Certifications

References

2016 songs
2016 singles
6lack songs
American hip hop songs
Trap music songs
Songs written by 6lack
Cloud rap songs